Problepsis erythra is a moth of the family Geometridae. It is found in Eritrea.

References

Moths described in 1982
Scopulini
Moths of Africa